Duncan Scott may refer to:

 Duncan Campbell Scott (1862–1947), Canadian bureaucrat, poet and prose writer
 Duncan Scott (comics) (died 2021), British comics artist
 Duncan Scott (director) (born 1947), American film and television director, writer, and producer
 Duncan Scott (swimmer) (born 1997), British swimmer